Smithfield is an unincorporated community in Jasper County, in the U.S. state of Missouri.

History
A post office called Smithfield was established in 1871, and remained in operation until 1934. The community has the name of the local Smith family.

References

Unincorporated communities in Jasper County, Missouri
Unincorporated communities in Missouri